Bangers and mash, also known as sausages and mash, is a traditional British dish, consisting of sausages served with mashed potatoes. It may consist of one of a variety of flavoured sausages made of pork, lamb, or beef. The dish is usually served with onion gravy, but may also include fried onions and peas.

This dish, even when cooked at home, may be thought of as an example of pub grub, meaning it is relatively quick and easy to make in large quantities.

In 2009, the dish was listed as Britain's most popular comfort food in a survey commissioned by TV channel Good Food.

Etymology
Although it is sometimes stated that the term "bangers" has its origins in World War II, the term was actually in use at least as far back as 1919. The term "bangers" is attributed (in common usage in the UK) to the fact that sausages made during World War I, when there were meat shortages, were made with such a high water content that they were liable to pop under high heat when cooked.

See also
 List of sausage dishes

References

Belgian cuisine
British cuisine
Dutch cuisine
French cuisine
German cuisine
Irish cuisine
Potato dishes
Sausage dishes
Meat and potatoes dishes